Viktor Vasylovych Postol (born 16 January 1984) is a Ukrainian professional boxer who held the WBC light-welterweight title from 2015 to 2016 and challenged twice for the WBO light-welterweight title in 2016 and in 2020. As of May 2021, he is ranked as the world's fifth best active light-welterweight by the Transnational Boxing Rankings Board and by BoxRec and fourth by The Ring magazine.

Professional career

Early career 
Postol made his professional debut on 1 October 2007 at the age of 23 against Zsolt Vicze, stopping him in round 2. He won his next fourteen bouts fighting in countries Bosnia and Herzegovina, Ukraine, Spain, Russia and Georgia. Postol's first significant title fight came in December 2011 against Karen Tevosyan for the vacant WBC Silver International light welterweight title. Postol managed to win via unanimous decision to claim the belt. He then successfully defended it against Yvan Mendy and DeMarcus Corley.

After vacating the belt, it was announced in February 2013 that Postol would next fight American boxer Hank Lundy for the vacant WBC International light welterweight title. Lundy was originally due to fight Lucas Matthysse, but the fight fell apart. Postol won the bout via a 12-round unanimous decision. Two judges scored the fight 116-112 and the remaining judge scored it 116-113 all in Postol's favour. Before vacating the belt, Postol had managed to retain it against Ignacio Mendoza.

On 7 November 2013, the World Boxing Council ordered a final eliminator for their super lightweight title, held at the time by unified champion Danny García, which would see Postol fight Turkish boxer Selçuk Aydin (26-2, 19 KOs). Before engaging in the eliminator, Postol finished the year with a dominant decision win over tough journeyman Behzod Nabiyev (22-6-1, 16 KOs) at the SportLife club in Kyiv, Ukraine. Over 10 rounds, Nabiyev was dropped once in round 4 and twice in the final round. The three judges scored all rounds for Postol (100-79).

In February 2014, a purse bid took place where Elite Boxing Promotions bid an amount of $120,000, which was more than Aydin's promoter Ahmet Oner offer, which was $50,000. Due to Postol's team winning the bid, the fight was likely set for Ukraine. It was instead announced to take place at The Forum in Inglewood, California on the undercard of Márquez vs. Alvarado on 17 May 2014. On his American debut, Postol stopped Aydin in round 11 to become the mandatory challenger for the WBC title. The time of stoppage was 2:52 of the round.

On 19 August 2014, the WBC ordered Postol vs. García and scheduled purse bids for 12 September. This was then pushed back to 10 October. On 11 October, Postol's manager Vadim Kornilov stated a deal was close to being reached for García to make a voluntary defence before fighting Postol. Kornilov said, "There is a step aside agreement that we have almost finalized. Postol and García will both get options to take other fights over the next 4 months and then Postol will again be in the mandatory position to fight the WBC champion." Both camps agreed the step-a-side deal the same day. Postol next planned to fight again in December 2014. Having not fought in December 2014, in January 2015, Postol announced that he would fight on the undercard of Danny García vs. Lamont Peterson on 11 April at the Barclays Center in New York. Kornilov announced his opponent to be Jake Giuriceo (17-2-1, 4 KOs) in a scheduled 10 round bout. This was later shortened to 8 rounds. Postol won the fight via unanimous decision after 8 rounds.

WBC super lightweight champion

Postol vs. Matthysse 
It was announced that Postol would fight Lucas Matthysse (37-3, 34 KOs) in a scheduled 12 round bout for the WBC light welterweight title vacated by Danny García in order to move up to the welterweight division in August, at the StubHub Center in Carson, California on 3 October 2015. The camps made a deal just in time to avoid a WBC purse bid scheduled for Monday.

After waiting 17 months for a world title shot, Postol outboxed and outpunched Matthysse before knocking him out with a right hand to the eye in the 10th round to punctuate a superb performance and win a vacant 140-pound world title before 7,025 at the StubHub Center. Round after round, Postol attacked Matthysse to the body and kept his jab in his face. Matthysse landed a few hard right hands that rocked Postol during the middle rounds, but not enough to do any serious damage. In the 10th round, Postol nailed Matthysse on the left eye with a clean right hand and he went down. Matthysse got to one knee, but with his head down and dabbing at his eye, referee Reiss counted him out at 2 minutes, 58 seconds. At the time of the knockout, Postol led 86-85 on two scorecards and Matthysse surprisingly led 86-85 on the other. According to CompuBox punch statistics, Postol landed 113 of 509 punches (22 percent) and Matthysse connected on 96 of 281 (34 percent).

Postol vs. Crawford 
On 3 May 2016 it was finally confirmed that Postol and Terence Crawford had officially signed a contract for a highly anticipated junior welterweight unification fight on 23 July at the MGM Grand in Las Vegas. Both fighters entered the ring with a matched record of 28 wins, no losses. Both men also entered the MGM Grand Garden Arena for the first time in their respective careers. Crawford won by unanimous decision and unified two light welterweight world titles before a crowd of 7,027. Crawford also claimed the vacant Lineal and Ring Magazine titles. Crawford scored two flash knockdowns in the fifth round, on going away on all three scorecards 118-107, 118-107 and 117-108. ESPN.com also scored the fight 118-107 for Crawford. Postol resorted to rabbit punching in the 11th round. He nailed Crawford with a right hand behind the head, for which Postol was penalized one point, adding to Crawford's advantage. With the victory, Crawford staked his indisputable claim to division supremacy and set himself up for bigger fights, possibly against a returning Manny Pacquiao. Over 12 rounds, Crawford landed 141 of his 388 punches thrown (36%), and  Postol landed 83 of 244 thrown (34%).

In the post-fight, Postol praised Crawford, saying "I thought it was a good fight between two technicians, but he was quicker than me. He is one of the best fighters in the world. I just didn't have the answers for him." Crawford also praised his trainer Brian McIntyre, "Freddie Roach and Postol said that Freddie would outcoach my coach, but you tell 'em who got outcoached tonight." McIntyre revealed the plan was to keep Postol moving, which would have eliminated his jab and right hand. Crawford's purse for the fight was $1.3 million. Postol earned $675,000 for his part. Some sources stated the fight generated 50,000 PPV buys on HBO. A replay was shown later in the week and drew 378,000, also considered a weak number.

Career from 2017 to 2019

Postol vs. Najmiddinov 
After nearly 14 months out, Postol would make his ring return in his native Ukraine at the AKKO International in Kyiv. Ringtv announced that Postol, who was still ranked by the WBC at #3, would fight inexperienced Uzbekistani boxer Jamshidbek Najmiddinov (14-0, 9 KOs) on 16 September 2017. Postol explained his time away from boxing, “After the Crawford fight, I took one month rest and then I got back to the gym. I have been ready to fight within all that time, with any opponent, but the question why I was absent should be directed to my manager.” His manager Vadim Kornilov answered, “We have been looking for the right opportunities for Postol in the United States and it’s been hard to get a TV spot for a non-U.S. fighter lately. We hope to make up for it in the next year.” Postol had appeared on HBO a total of three times in the past. Kornilov further explained that even when Postol was winning his fights, the possibility of finding TV opportunities were still slim.

Postol won a hard-fought fight, settling for a unanimous decision against Najmiddinov. Throughout the 10 rounds, Najmiddinov moved around the ring, throwing minimal punches. The opening rounds started with Postol controlling the fight and Najmiddinov swinging, but mostly missing Postol with counters. In round 5, Postol was floored with a left hook and hit the canvas hard. Postol beat the count, but on wobbly legs. Najmiddinov looked for the finish, but Postol survived the round. Najmiddinov couldn't capitalise on the knockdown as Postol regained his composure and dominated the remainder of the fight. The final judges scorecards read 98-92, 97-92, and 97-92 in favour of Postol.

The WBC super lightweight title became vacant after Terence Crawford decided to move up to welterweight. It was announced that number 1 ranked Amir Imam would fight number 3 ranked Jose Ramirez for the vacant title. WBC President Mauricio Sulaiman then announced that Postol, who was ranked number 4, would fight number 2 ranked Regis Prograis (20-0, 17 KOs) for the interim WBC title. The winner of both fights would then meet to become the full titleholder. In January 2018, a deal was finally reached for the fight between Postol and Prograis to take place on 9 March at the Buffalo Run Casino in Miami, Florida. Purse bids were due the next day. On 12 February, ESPN reported that Postol suffered a fractured thumb and then forced to drop out of the bout. His replacement was confirmed as former unified champion Julius Indongo (22-1, 11 KOs).

Postol vs. Taylor 
On 26 April 2018, Cyclone Promotions announced Postol would be fighting their 27 year old rising prospect Josh Taylor at the SSE Hydro in Glasgow on 23 June, with Taylor defending his WBC Silver title and a chance for the winner to become a step closer to challenging for a world title. Postol was regarded as Taylor's toughest opponent to date in his 12-fight career. In a very competitive fight, Postol was dropped once and lost a unanimous decision to Taylor. The three judges scored the bout 117-110, 118-110 and 119-108 in favour of Taylor, however some believed the scores were too wide in what appeared a relatively close fight. Postol started the fight stronger but it was during the middle rounds where Taylor took control, eventually dropping Postol in round 10. Taylor was being urged by his team throughout the fight, but it was only the second half of the fight where he started being more aggressive and landing to the body. Taylor spent the last few rounds hitting Postol with his signature left hook. Taylor's promoter Barry McGuigan admitted the fight was 'terrific', but stated the scores should have been closer.

Postol vs. Ozgul 
On 8 October 2018, the WBC revealed mandatories and eliminators they were looking to enforce in the near future, with one of them being a semi-final eliminator between Postol and Mohamed Mimoune. On 24 October, Postol was announced by the World Boxing Super Series as a reserve fighter for Josh Taylor vs. Ryan Martin on 3 November 2018 at the SSE Hydro in Glasgow. It was said that Postol would fight Turkish boxer Siar Ozgul (14-1, 3 KOs). As a reserve fighter, due to an unlikely scenario where one of the original participants cannot compete, Postol would step in. Postol was taken the 10 round distance, dominating the fight. Postol won via a points decision 99-91 on the referees scorecard.

Postol vs. Mimoune 
On 19 March 2019, it was announced that Postol would fight French boxer Mohamed Mimoune (21-2, 2 KO) in a WBC final eliminator on 27 April. The bout was officially ordered by the WBC in October 2018. The fight was confirmed a week later to be part of a Showtime tripleheader featuring Robert Easter Jr. vs. Rances Barthelemy at The Joint at Hard Rock Hotel & Casino in Las Vegas. Postol defeated Mimoune by a 10 round unanimous decision to become a step closer to challenging WBC champion José Ramírez. Postol threw punches throughout and got the better of Mimoune in every round of the fight, mostly using his stiff jab and using his reach advantage. Postol managed to knock Mimoune off balance a number of times. By round 8, Mimoune's right eye began to swell. The three judges scored the fight 98-92, 97-93, and 99-91 for Postol. CompuBox showed that Postol landed 149 of 587 punches thrown (25%) and Mimoune landed 73 of his 306 punches (24%). Postol attributed the win with Freddie Roach's game plan and that he was able to stay disciplined. Showtime's unofficial judge Steve Farhood, gave Postol all 10 rounds or the fight.

Postol vs. Ramirez 
On 29 August, 2020, Postol, ranked #4 by The Ring and the WBO and #1 by the WBC, fought WBC and WBO super lightweight champion Jose Ramirez. In a very close fight, Ramirez managed to do enough in the eyes of two of the judges two score the majority decision victory. The scorecards read 116-112, 115-113 and 114-114 for Ramirez.

Professional boxing record

Pay-per-view bouts

References

External links

Viktor Postol - Profile, News Archive & Current Rankings at Box.Live

1984 births
People from Kyiv Oblast
Living people
Ukrainian male boxers
World light-welterweight boxing champions
World Boxing Council champions
Sportspeople from Kyiv Oblast